Fowlds is a surname. Notable people with the surname include:

Derek Fowlds (1937–2020), British actor
George Fowlds (1860–1934), New Zealand politician